The Mentawai three-striped squirrel (Lariscus obscurus) is a species of rodent in the family Sciuridae.  It is endemic to Indonesia and has a natural habitat of subtropical or tropical dry forests.

References

External links  
  ITIS

Lariscus
Mammals of Indonesia
Taxonomy articles created by Polbot
Mammals described in 1903